Deh-e Bonar-e Yusefi (also Romanized as Deh-e Bonār-e Yūsefī; also known as Deh-e Bonār) is a village in Sar Asiab-e Yusefi Rural District, Bahmai-ye Garmsiri District, Bahmai County, Kohgiluyeh and Boyer-Ahmad Province, Iran. At the 2006 census, its population was 282, in 53 families.

References 

Populated places in Bahmai County